Lynchburg is an unincorporated community in Cass County, in the U.S. state of North Dakota.

History
A post office called Lynchburg was established in 1895, and remained in operation until 1911. The community was named for Frank Lynch, a railroad official.

References

Unincorporated communities in Cass County, North Dakota
Unincorporated communities in North Dakota